Les Palmes de M. Schutz is a 1997 French drama film directed by Claude Pinoteau and starring Isabelle Huppert.

Cast
 Isabelle Huppert as Marie Curie
 Philippe Noiret as Paul Schützenberger (Monsieur Schutz)
 Charles Berling as Pierre Curie
 Christian Charmetant as Gustave Bémont
 Philippe Morier-Genoud as De Clausat
 Marie-Laure Descoureaux as Georgette
 Pierre-Gilles de Gennes as Delivery man
 Georges Charpak as Lorry driver
 Suzanne Andrews as Loie Fuller
 Pierre Belot as Visiteur
 Julien Cafaro as Arsène
 Gérard Caillaud as Président séance

Reception
The film opened on 130 screens in France and grossed $543,320 in its opening week, placing eighth at the French box office.

See also
 Isabelle Huppert on screen and stage
 Notable film portrayals of Nobel laureates

References

External links

1997 films
1997 drama films
French drama films
1990s French-language films
Films directed by Claude Pinoteau
Biographical films about scientists
Films about Nobel laureates
Films set in the 1890s
Films set in the 1900s
Films about Marie Curie
1990s French films